The Filmfare Best Supporting Actor Award is given by the Filmfare magazine as part of its annual Filmfare Awards South for Tamil (Kollywood) films.

The award was introduced and first given at the 50th South Filmfare Awards in 2003, with Jayaram being the first recipient.

Superlatives

Multiple Nominations
9 nominations:Prakash raj

Winners

Nominations

2000s
2002 – Jayaram – Panchathanthiram
 J. D. Chakravarthy – Kannathil Muthamittal
 Prabhu – Charlie Chaplin
 Prakash Raj – Kannathil Muthamittal
 Yugi Sethu – Ramana
2003 – Suriya – Pithamagan
 Madhavan – Anbe Sivam
 Prakash Raj – Chokka Thangam
2004 – R. Madhavan – Aayutha Ezhuthu
 Prabhu – Vasool Raja MBBS
 Prakash Raj – M. Kumaran S/O Mahalakshmi
 Rajkiran – Kovil
 Siddharth – Aayutha Ezhuthu
2005 – Rajkiran – Thavamai Thavamirundhu
 Arya – Ullam Ketkumae
 Napoleon – Ayya
 Pasupathy – Majaa
 Prabhu – Chandramukhi
2006 – Pasupathy – E
 Guinness Pakru – Dishyum
 Nassar – Em Magan
 Prakash Raj – Vettaiyaadu Vilaiyaadu
 Vadivelu – Em Magan
2007 – Saravanan – Paruthiveeran
 Kishore – Polladhavan
 Prabhu – Billa
 Prakash Raj – Mozhi
 Suman – Sivaji
2008 – Ajmal Ameer – Anjathey
 Prakash Raj – Abhiyum Naanum
 Prasanna – Anjathe
 Sampath Raj – Saroja
 Samuthirakani – Subramaniyapuram
2009 – Jayaprakash – Pasanga
 Jagan – Ayan
 Prabhu – Ayan
 Rajendran – Naan Kadavul
 Vadivelu – Aadhavan
 Vivek – Padikathavan

2010s
2010 – Parthiban – Aayirathil Oruvan
 Madhavan – Manmadan Ambu
 Prakash Raj – Singam
 Prithviraj – Raavanan
 Santhanam – Boss Engira Bhaskaran
 Thambi Ramaiah – Mynaa
2011 – Ajmal Ameer – Ko
 Santhanam – Deiva Thirumagal
 Santhanam – Siruthai
 Sunder Ramu – Mayakkam Enna
 V. I. S. Jayapalan – Aadukalam
2012 – Thambi Ramaiah – Kumki
 Pasupathi – Aravaan
 Santhanam – Oru Kal Oru Kannadi
 Sathyaraj – Nanban
 Vidyut Jamwal – Thuppakki
2013 – Sathyaraj – Raja Rani
 Arya – Arrambam
 Jai – Raja Rani
 Jerry – Paradesi
 Rahman – Singam 2
2014 – Bobby Simha – Jigarthanda 
 Kalaiyarasan – Madras
 Prithviraj – Kaaviya Thalaivan
 Samuthirakani – Velaiyilla Pattathari
 Thambi Ramiah – Kathai Thiraikathai Vasanam Iyakkam
2015 – Arvind Swamy – Thani Oruvan Arun Vijay – Yennai Arindhaal
 K. S. Ravikumar – Thanga Magan
 Prakash Raj – OK Kanmani
 R. Parthiepan – Naanum Rowdy Dhaan
2016 – Samuthirakani – Visaranai Mahendran – Theri Rajendran – Theri Sathish – Remo Sathish Krishnan – Achcham Yenbadhu Madamaiyada2017 – Prasanna – Thiruttu Payale 2 Abhimanyu Singh – Theeran Adhigaram Ondru S. J. Suryah – Mersal Vinay Rai – Thupparivaalan Vivek Oberoi – Vivegam2018 – Sathyaraj – Kanaa Akshay Kumar – 2.0 Anurag Kashyap – Imaikkaa Nodigal Arun Vijay – Chekka Chivantha Vaanam Samuthirakani – Kaala Yogi Babu – Kolamavu Kokila2020-2021 – Pasupathy – Sarpatta Parambarai Gautham Vasudev Menon – Kannum Kannum Kollaiyadithaal Paresh Rawal – Soorarai Pottru Prakash Raj – Jai Bhim R. Sarathkumar – Vaanam Kottatum S. J. Suryah – Maanaadu Samuthirakani – Udanpirappe''

References

External links
52nd Annual Awards

Supporting Actor